Exchange Square can refer to:
Exchange Square (Johannesburg), South Africa
Exchange Square (Hong Kong)
Exchange Square, Manchester, England
Exchange Square tram stop
Exchange Square (London), England